Mike or Michael Pyle may refer to:
 Mike Pyle (American football) (1939–2015), American football player
 Mike Pyle (fighter) (born 1975), American mixed martial arts fighter

See also
 Robert Michael Pyle (born 1947), American lepidopterist and writer